The 2018 Folds of Honor QuikTrip 500 was a Monster Energy NASCAR Cup Series race held on February 25, 2018, at Atlanta Motor Speedway in Hampton, Georgia. Contested over 325 laps on the 1.54-mile-long (2.48 km) asphalt quad-oval intermediate speedway, it was the second race of the 2018 Monster Energy NASCAR Cup Series season.

Report

Background

Atlanta Motor Speedway (formerly Atlanta International Raceway) is a track in Hampton, Georgia, 20 miles (32 km) south of Atlanta. It is a  quad-oval track with a seating capacity of 111,000. It opened in 1960 as a  standard oval. In 1994, 46 condominiums were built over the northeastern side of the track. In 1997, to standardize the track with Speedway Motorsports' other two  ovals, the entire track was almost completely rebuilt. The frontstretch and backstretch were swapped, and the configuration of the track was changed from oval to quad-oval. The project made the track one of the fastest on the NASCAR circuit.

Entry list

First practice

Qualifying

Qualifying results

Final practice

Race
Morning rain delayed the start of the race by 2.5 hours, The race was originally to start at 2:00 p.m. but the race was pushed to 1:00 p.m. because of rain, Track drying allowed the start of the race to begin at 3:30 pm EST. Because of track lights they were able to complete the race in its entirety.

Stage 1

Start
Once racing began, Kyle Busch led the field to the green flag, but Ryan Newman took the lead on lap 1 and led 17 laps, but then Kyle Busch took the lead from Newman on lap 18 and led 2 laps, but then Kevin Harvick took the lead on lap 21 and led 11 laps, but then the first caution of the race flew on lap 32 for a scheduled competition caution for rain, so Kyle Busch retook the lead once the caution came out and led one lap and Kevin Harvick took the lead of the race on lap 33.

Racing resumed on lap 35.

Kevin Harvick led 64 laps en route to his stage one victory, finishing 6.5 seconds in front of second place Clint Bowyer. Also in the top five was Brad Keselowski, Martin Truex Jr., and Aric Almirola. The second caution of the race came out on lap 87 for conclusion of the first stage, and Martin Truex Jr. took the lead on lap 89 and led one lap, but then Brad Keselowski took the lead from Truex on lap 90.

Stage 2 
Back to green on lap 93. Kurt Busch took the lead on lap 101 and led 25 laps and Kevin Harvick took the lead on lap 126 and led two laps, and Kyle Busch took the lead on lap 127.

Caution flew for the third time on lap 160 for a single car spin in turn 2. Jimmie Johnson got through the second turn and spun out. He was lapped by leader Kevin Harvick.

Racing restarted on lap 164.

Brad Keselowski outran Kurt Busch to win the second stage. Following were Kyle Busch, Joey Logano and Kevin Harvick.

Caution #4 flew on lap 172 for conclusion of the second stage.

Final stage 

Back to green on lap 178.

Brad Keselowski took the lead with 101 laps to go and rain threatened to end the race with about 100 laps to go, as three drivers including Kevin Harvick, Brad Keselowski and Kurt Busch wrestled to take the lead. Crew chiefs were concerned about watching the weather.

The final stage developed in strategies as the teams of Denny Hamlin and Joey Logano ran in green flag pit stops than other leaders, attempting to use one less stop as the other cars.

With 27 laps to go, the fifth caution of the race came out when Trevor Bayne blew an engine in Turn 2, creating a plume of smoke behind him. Darrell Wallace Jr. slammed in the back of Ricky Stenhouse Jr. which caused damage to Wallace Jr.'s car.

Racing restarted with 20 laps to go, and Kevin Harvick led 173 of 325 laps and drove on to score his second career Atlanta victory since 2001.

Post race
"To be able to pay tribute to Dale Earnhardt was cool, been waiting a long time to do that" Harvick said.

Stage Results

Stage 1
Laps: 85

Stage 2
Laps: 85

Final Stage Results

Stage 3
Laps: 155

Race statistics

 24 lead changes among 8 drivers
 5 cautions for 28 laps
 Time of race: 3 hours, 29 minutes and 54 seconds
 Average speed: 
 Margin of victory: 2.690 seconds

Media

Television
The Folds of Honor QuikTrip 500 was carried by Fox in the United States. Mike Joy, five-time Atlanta winner Jeff Gordon and three-time Atlanta winner Darrell Waltrip worked the race from the booth. Pit road was manned by Jamie Little, Vince Welch and Matt Yocum.

Radio
The race was broadcast on radio by the Performance Racing Network and simulcast on Sirius XM NASCAR Radio. Doug Rice, Mark Garrow and Wendy Venturini called the race from the booth when the field raced down the front stretch. Rob Albright called the race from atop a billboard outside of turn 2 when the field raced through turns 1 and 2. Pat Patterson called the race from a billboard outside of turn 3 when the field raced through turns 3 and 4. On pit road, PRN was manned by Brad Gillie, Brett McMillan, Jim Noble and Doug Turnbull.

Standings after the race

Drivers' Championship standings

Manufacturers' Championship standings

Note: Only the first 16 positions are included for the driver standings.

References

2018 in sports in Georgia (U.S. state)
2018 Monster Energy NASCAR Cup Series
NASCAR races at Atlanta Motor Speedway
February 2018 sports events in the United States